Tomaz may refer to:

 Tomaž, Slovene given name
 Tomaz (given name), an archaic Portuguese form of the male given name Tomás
 Adrianna Tomaz, a fictional character from DC Comics
 Zari Tomaz, a fictional character from the TV series Legends of Tomorrow